Carving Out the Eyes of God is the fourth studio album by American blackened death metal band Goatwhore.

Track listing

Personnel 
 Ben Falgoust – lead vocals
 Sammy Duet – guitars, backing vocals
 Nathan Bergeron – bass, backing vocals
 Zack Simmons – drums

References 

2009 albums
Goatwhore albums
Metal Blade Records albums
Albums produced by Erik Rutan